Patrick Ho Chi-ping  (born 24 July 1949 in Hong Kong) is a Hong Kong ophthalmologist turned politician.

He joined the Chinese People's Political Consultative Conference and the Preparatory Committee of Hong Kong SAR. When the Principal Officials Accountability System was introduced in 2002, Chief Executive of Hong Kong Tung Chee-wah appointed Ho Secretary for Home Affairs, a senior ministerial post.

He was convicted of bribery offences in a U.S. federal court in 2018. The Medical Council of Hong Kong ruled that his name was removed from the General Register for a period of 1 year from May 2021.

Education and ophthalmologist career 
Ho studied in the Diocesan Boys' School, Hong Kong. He won a scholarship and was educated in the US for 16 years. An ophthalmologist who trained in eye surgery with special expertise in retinal surgery, he was a fellow at Harvard Medical School. He returned to Hong Kong in 1984 and taught eye surgery at the Chinese University of Hong Kong as Professor of Ophthalmology. From 1988 to 2000, he was Professor of Surgery (Ophthalmology) at the Chinese University of Hong Kong.

Political career
Since 1993, he has been a member of the 8th, 9th, 10th and 11th National Committee of the Chinese People's Political Consultative Conference, and in 1995, he was appointed as a member of the Preparatory Committee of the Hong Kong Special Administrative Region and the Selection Committee of the first SAR Government. Ho was appointed vice-chairman of the Hong Kong Policy Research Institute in 1996. In July 1997, he was appointed to the Provisional Urban Council until its disestablishment in 1999. In 2000, Ho was appointed Chairman of the Arts Development Council.

In 2002, he joined the Chief Executive of Hong Kong Tung Chee-wah's second HKSAR administration as the Secretary for Home Affairs when the Principal Officials Accountability System was introduced.  He served in this senior ministerial post for five years.

In 2003, Ho was present at the Che Kung Temple in Sha Tin following tradition and drew Kau Chim sticks to foretell the fortune of Hong Kong. He drew number 83 which represented bad times ahead. Hong Kong experienced a fatal SARS outbreak and an attempted imposition of Basic Law Article 23, which led to massive protests at the 1 July march. Ever since, no Hong Kong minister has represented the government to the temple.

Ho was appointed chairman of the Sports Council in 2005.

After leaving the government in 2007, he joined a lobbying firm established and funded by CEFC China Energy (CEFC), a Shanghai-based energy company, of which he became vice-chairman and secretary-general.  The organisation, under Ho, was a leading exponent of the Xi Jinping's Belt & Road Initiative.

Bribery and money laundering arrest and conviction 
Ho and former Senegalese foreign minister Cheikh Gadio were arrested in New York in late November 2017, charged with violating the Foreign Corrupt Practices Act (FCPA) and money laundering. The pair offered a US$2 million bribe to the president of Chad for oil rights, and deposited a US$500,000 bribe to an account designated by the Minister of Foreign Affairs of Uganda on behalf of CEFC. The million-dollar bribes were disguised as donations. The energy fund, chaired by Ye Jianming, denied authorising Ho to engage in corrupt practices.
James Biden, brother of Joe Biden, got a call from Patrick Ho when Ho was arrested by the FBI. James Biden said he believed it had been meant for Hunter Biden, the son of Joe Biden.

On 5 December 2018, Ho was convicted on seven counts of bribery and money laundering, following a federal trial in which Gadio stood as a witness for prosecutors.  He was sentenced to three years' imprisonment and fined $400,000 in March 2019.
After being imprisoned at the Metropolitan Correctional Center, New York, as of 9 June 2020, the South China Morning Post reported that Ho has been released and deported to Hong Kong.

Family
Ho has a daughter and a son from his marriage to a Chinese woman in the US. After returning to Hong Kong in 1984, he divorced his wife.

Ho married Taiwanese actress Sibelle Hu Huizhong on 5 September 1997. They have one daughter, Audrey Ho Ka-chun.

Other titles and memberships
 Special Honours by the Chinese Medical Association (CMA)
 Past member of the Preparatory Committee on Chinese Medicine and the Provisional Urban Council

See also
 Hong Kong Government Lunar New year kau cim tradition

References

Government officials of Hong Kong
Members of the Executive Council of Hong Kong
Academic staff of the Chinese University of Hong Kong
Hong Kong ophthalmologists
Members of the National Committee of the Chinese People's Political Consultative Conference
Chinese ophthalmologists
Living people
Members of the Preparatory Committee for the Hong Kong Special Administrative Region
Members of the Selection Committee of Hong Kong
1949 births
Hong Kong politicians convicted of crimes
20th-century Chinese physicians
Hong Kong government officials convicted of corruption
People's Republic of China politicians from Hong Kong